Abu Al-Hasan, also transliterated Abu'l Hasan, is an Arabic kunya ('teknonym'). It may refer to:

Notable people

Politics and military 
 Ali ibn Abi Talib (600–661), the fourth caliph of the Rashidun Caliphate
 Ali ibn Musa (766–818), the eight imam in Ashariyya
 Abu Al-Hasan Ali ibn Othman (1297–1351), a Marinid-dynasty sultan of Morocco and Al-Andalus
 Abu'l-Hasan Ali of Granada (died 1485)
 Abul Hasan Jashori (1918–1993), Bangladeshi Islamic scholar, politician and freedom fighter
 Abolhassan Banisadr (1933 – 2021), first president of Iran after the Iranian Revolution

Literature and sports 
 Abul Hasan (poet) (1947–1975), Bangladeshi poet
 Abu'l-Hasan (artist) (1589 – c. 1630), a Mughal-era painter
 Abulhasan Alekperzadeh or Abulhasan (1906–1986), Azerbaijani writer
 Abul Hasan (cricketer) (born 1992), Bangladeshi cricketer
 Abu Hassan, an 1811 opera by Carl Maria von Weber

See also